Thomas Jefferson High School for Science and Technology (also known as TJHSST, TJ,  or Jefferson) is a Virginia state-chartered magnet high school in Fairfax County, Virginia operated by Fairfax County Public Schools.

The school occupies the building of the previous Thomas Jefferson High School (constructed in 1964). A selective admissions program was initiated in 1985 through the cooperation of state and county governments, as well as corporate sponsorship from the defense and technology industries. It is one of 18 Virginia Governor's Schools, and a founding member of the National Consortium for Specialized Secondary Schools of Mathematics, Science and Technology. In 2021 and 2022, U.S. News & World Report ranked the school first in its annual "Best U.S. High Schools" list.

Attendance at the school is open to students in six local jurisdictions based on academic achievement, essays, and socio-economic background. Before the 2020–21 school year, the admissions process also involved a math, reading, and science exam.

History 
Thomas Jefferson High School was constructed and opened in 1964. Fairfax County Public Schools' superintendent William J. Burkholder and his staff began working on the idea of a science high school in 1983 with advice from the superintendent's business/advisory council. Burkholder announced the plans for the magnet school in January 1984. The school board chose Thomas Jefferson High School as the location for the new magnet school in June 1984 and approved the funding in February 1985. The school was originally intended to only serve Fairfax County students, but after Virginia governor Charles S. Robb chose Fairfax County as the location of a regional science and technology school, the school board voted to accept the funding from the state and allow students from Arlington, Loudoun, and Prince William counties and from the Cities of Fairfax and Falls Church to attend as well. The business community played a significant role in the creation of the school, providing around $3 million in contributions and advice on the school's curriculum. Hazleton Laboratories, Honeywell, AT&T, Virginia Power, Sony Corporation, Hewlett-Packard, and Xerox, among other companies, made significant contributions in equipment or finances to the school before it opened. Thomas Jefferson High School for Science and Technology opened in fall 1985 with 400 ninth-graders and 125 seniors who were selected  from 1,200 applicants.

The school underwent renovations from 2013 to 2017, adding additional research labs, internet cafes, three-dimensional art galleries, a black box theater, and a dome reminiscent of President Thomas Jefferson's Monticello. The renovations costed $90 million.

Admissions 

The school is part of the Fairfax County Public Schools system of Fairfax County, Virginia. Students from Fairfax, Arlington, Loudoun, and Prince William counties and from the Cities of Fairfax and Falls Church are eligible for admission. Students must be enrolled in Algebra 1 or a higher level math class in 8th grade and have a minimum GPA of 3.5 to be eligible.

The admissions process is based on grade point average, a math or science related problem solving essay, a student portrait sheet demonstrating skills and character, and details about a student's socio-economic background including whether they are economically disadvantaged, a special education student, or an English language learner. Each public school is allocated a number of seats equal to 1.5% of that school's 8th grade student population; the remaining seats are unallocated and offered to the highest evaluated remaining students. During the admissions process, students are identified only by a number; admissions officers do not know their race, ethnicity, sex, or name.

Before the 2020–21 school year, the admissions process also included a math, reading, and science exam.

Demographics and exam controversy

The admissions process and the demographics of the student body it produces, in particular the under-representation of black and Hispanic students relative to the school system overall, have been a source of controversy throughout the school's history.

After the school's early graduating classes included relatively few black and Hispanic students, FCPS created a race-based affirmative action program to admit more black and Hispanic students. The program was in effect for the admissions process for the graduating classes of 1997 through 2002; the county ended it because of legal challenges to similar programs. Following the end of this program, the share of black and Hispanic students at the school decreased from 9.4 percent in 1997–98 to 3.5 percent in 2003–04. Black and Hispanic students remained significantly under-represented at the school through the 2000s and 2010s.

In 2012, a civil rights complaint against the school was filed with the U.S. Department of Education Office of Civil Rights by Coalition of the Silence, an advocacy group led by former county School Board member Tina Hone, and the Fairfax chapter of the NAACP, alleging that it discriminated against black, Hispanic, and disabled students. In response, the Office of Civil Rights, in September 2012, opened an investigation.

In 2020, the school board made a number of significant changes to the admissions process meant to increase the ratio of black and Hispanic students admitted. These included the elimination of the application fee; the increase of the number of admitted students from around 480 to 550; the elimination of an entrance exam; the allocation of seats to each middle school equal to 1.5% of their 8th grade student population; and the addition of "experience factors" including whether students are economically disadvantaged, English language learners, or special education students. Following these changes, the proportion of black and Hispanic students admitted increased from 4.52% to 18.36% while the proportion of Asian Americans decreased from 73.05% to 54.36%. The proportion of female students admitted also increased, from 41.80% to 46.00%, and to 55.45% the next year.

In March 2021, the Coalition for TJ, an advocacy group opposed to the changes and represented by the Pacific Legal Foundation, sued the Fairfax County school board, alleging that the 2020 changes to the admissions process discriminated against Asian Americans. In February 2022, judge Claude M. Hilton of the United States District Court for the Eastern District of Virginia ruled in Coalition for TJ v. Fairfax County School Board in the Coalition for TJ's favor and ordered the school to return to the previous admissions process. The school board appealed the decision to the United States Court of Appeals for the Fourth Circuit and in March 2022 that court issued a stay on the order that allowed the school to continue the new admissions process while the case was pending. The Supreme Court of the United States rejected a request to vacate the stay in April 2022. The case is scheduled to be heard in the court of appeals in September 2022.

Curriculum

TJ's curriculum is focused on college preparation and provides students with the opportunity to achieve in all disciplines, with an emphasis on science and technology. TJ's graduation requirements include a Computer Science course and a science or technology research project, which are not required by other FCPS high schools. This research project can be completed in one of TJ's thirteen on-campus research laboratories or through a mentorship program at an external laboratory. As of 2023, TJ offers 26 Advanced Placement courses and 20 "post-AP" courses in STEM subjects that require AP courses as prerequisites.

TJ3Sat and TJREVERB projects 
The Systems Engineering Course designed and built a CubeSat which was launched on November 19, 2013, from Wallops Flight Facility in Virginia. Orbital Sciences Corporation donated the CubeSat Kit to the school on December 6, 2006, and provided the launch for the satellite.  After a successful launch at 8:15PM EST, TJ3SAT became the first satellite launched into space that was built by high school students. The launched satellite contained a 4-watt transmitter operating on amateur radio frequencies, and a text-to-speech module to allow it to broadcast ASCII-encoded messages sent to it from Jefferson.

TJREVERB, a 2U CubeSat, is the school's second CubeSat mission. After a 6-year period of planning, building, and testing from 2016 to 2022 that was interrupted by the COVID-19 pandemic, REVERB was launched aboard SpaceX's CRS-26 on November 26, 2022, at 2:20PM EST. REVERB was deployed from the International Space Station on December 29, 2022 via Nanoracks. The satellite is being located through crowdsourcing, with help from AMSAT. It will test the Iridium satellite radio and connect to the students' ground station through email.

Computer Systems Lab 

The school's computer systems lab is one of the few high school computing facilities with a supercomputer. In 1988, a team from the school won an ETA-10P supercomputer in the SuperQuest competition, a national science competition for high school students. The ETA-10P was damaged by a roof leak in the 1990s. Cray Inc. donated a new SV1 supercomputer, known as Seymour, to the school on December 4, 2002, which is on display as of 2021.

The lab also supported a number of Sun Microsystems thin clients for use by students enrolled in AP Computer Science. In 2008, the school received a grant from Sun Microsystems for $388,048, which was student-written. The Syslab was given 7 Sun workstations, 12 Sun servers, and 145 Sun Rays for distribution throughout the school. These were placed in the existing AP Computer Science Lab and the science classrooms, support backend services, and serve as kiosks placed around the school for guests, students, and faculty. However, the Sun Rays were taken out of the AP Computer Science Lab due to teachers' objections. By 2014, the Sun Ray clients were decommissioned, and replaced with Linux-based thin clients running LTSP.

Since 2000, students have built and maintained an Intranet application used to give students access to school resources remotely, and to manage the Eighth Period program. Three iterations of the application have been developed: the original system, built in 2000 as an early PHP application; Intranet2, known as Iodine, which used object-oriented PHP; and Ion, written in Python using the Django web framework.

Extra-curricular activities 
TJ students are required to participate in extra-curricular activities during their 8th period, which typically occurs on Wednesdays and Fridays. 8th periods allow students to seek out academic support and/or enrichment or participate in any of the clubs and activities, of which there are more than 150. These clubs activities explore diversity, academic competition, outreach, service, and more.

Awards and recognition 
In 2021 and 2022, U.S. News & World Report ranked TJ as the best overall high school in the United States. It was previously ranked fourth in 2020, tenth in 2019, and sixth in 2018. In 2016, the school placed first in Newsweeks annual "America's Top High Schools" rankings for the third consecutive year. The average SAT score for the graduating class of 2020 was 1528 and the average ACT score was 34.5.

The school had 14 Intel Science Talent Search Semifinalists in 2007, 15 in 2009, and 13 in 2010.

In 2007, for schools with more than 800 students in grades 10–12, TJ was cited as having the highest-performing AP Calculus BC, AP Chemistry, AP French Language, AP Government and Politics, U.S., and AP U.S. History courses among all schools worldwide. In 2014, 3864 AP Exams were taken by students; over 97% earned a score of 3, 4, or 5.

President Barack Obama signed the America Invents Act into law on September 16, 2011, at the school. The law was made to reform U.S. patent laws.

In 1997, 2000, 2013, and 2017, the wind ensemble of the school was among fifteen high-school bands invited to the Music for All National Concert Band Festival in Indianapolis.

Merit award controversy
In December 2022, it was reported that during the previous five years, some students at the school who had been named National Merit Scholars had not been notified of their achievement. A lawyer named Shawnna Yashar, whose son was one of the students at the school whose award information had not been reported by the school, said, "Keeping these certificates from students is theft by the state." School officials stated that the issue was a "one-time human error."

Notable alumni 

 Yohannes Abraham, government official
 Chris Avellone, game designer
 Praveen Balakrishnan, Chess Grandmaster
 Sandra Beasley, poet
 Bob Bland, fashion designer and activist
 Ian Caldwell, author
 Mark Changizi, theoretical cognitive scientist
 Mike Elias, baseball executive
 Mark Embree, mathematician and Rhodes Scholar
 Eric Froehlich, professional poker and Magic: The Gathering player
 Sara Goldrick-Rab, sociologist
 Stephanie Hannon, CTO of Hillary Clinton presidential campaign, 2016
 Darius Kazemi, programmer, artist, and co-founder of Feel Train
 Sophia Kianni, climate activist
 Andrew Kirmse, game developer and computer programmer
 Ehren Kruger, screenwriter
 Christo Landry, professional long-distance runner
 Howard Lerman, entrepreneur, co-founder of Yext
 Jose Llana, actor
 Geoffrey von Maltzahn, biological engineer, founder of Indigo Agriculture
 Mehret Mandefro, film/televesion producer, writer, physician, anthropologist
 Ashley Miller, screenwriter
 Kathryn Minshew, CEO and co-founder of The Muse
 Anthony Myint, restaurateur
 Aparna Nancherla, comedian
 Amna Nawaz, broadcast journalist
 Thao Nguyen, singer-songwriter
 Michael Hun Park, United States circuit judge of the United States Court of Appeals for the Second Circuit
 Emma Pierson, computer scientist and Rhodes Scholar
 Conor Russomanno, creator of OpenBCI
 Robert Sarvis, lawyer
 Monika Schleier-Smith, experimental physicist and MacArthur Fellow (2020)
 Andrew Seliskar, swimmer
 Meagan Spooner, author
 Chris Sununu, Governor of New Hampshire
 Vlad Tenev, co-founder of Robinhood
 Owen Thomas, journalist
 Dustin Thomason, author
 Anne Toth, Head of Data Policy at the World Economic Forum 
 Greg Tseng, entrepreneur, co-founder and CEO of Tagged
 Helen Wan, novelist and lawyer
 Staci Wilson, soccer player, olympian

See also 
 Coalition for TJ v. Fairfax County School Board
 Bronx High School of Science
 Illinois Mathematics and Science Academy
 Lowell High School (San Francisco)
 Stuyvesant High School

References

Further reading 
 Lindsey, Drew. "Success Factory: Inside America's Best High School", Washingtonian, October 1, 2009.

Educational institutions established in 1985
Public high schools in Virginia
High schools in Fairfax County, Virginia
Magnet schools in Virginia
NCSSS schools
Education in Loudoun County, Virginia
1985 establishments in Virginia